Maracá Ecological Station is an ecological station in Boa Vista, Roraima, Brazil. 
It consists of a large island in the Uraricoera River that is covered by Amazon rainforest.

History

The Maracá Ecological Station was established by presidential decree on 2 June 1981.
It was established with the purpose of preserving a representative sample of the Amazon ecosystem.
A grid of trails was designed by the Roraima regional center of PPBio, and completed in March 2006.

Status

It is administered by the Chico Mendes Institute for Biodiversity Conservation.
The conservation unit is supported by the Amazon Region Protected Areas Program.
It would be included in the proposed Northern Amazon Ecological Corridor.
The White-bellied spider monkey (Ateles belzebuth) is a protected species in the reserve.

References

Sources

Ecological stations of Brazil
Boa Vista, Roraima
Protected areas of Roraima
Protected areas established in 1981
1981 establishments in Brazil